Bad Blankenburg is a spa town in the district of Saalfeld-Rudolstadt, in Thuringia, Germany. It is situated 6 km southwest of Rudolstadt, and 37 km southeast of Erfurt. It is most famous for being the location of the first kindergarten of Friedrich Wilhelm August Fröbel, in 1837.

To the north of it, on an eminence, rise the fine ruins of the castle of Greifenstein, built by the German king Henry I, and from 1275 to 1583 the seat of a cadet branch of the counts of Schwarzburg.

In the nineteenth century, Bad Blankenburg was part of the small principality of Schwarzburg-Rudolstadt.

Bad Blankenburg is the headquarters of Deutsche Evangelische Allianz, a cooperative network of most Protestant churches in Germany.

The main sights of Bad Blankenburg on OpenstreetMap.

Historical Population 

Historical Population (from 1960 as of 31 December):

  Data source from 1994: Thuringian Office for Statistics

Twin towns – sister cities

References

External links

Friedrich Fröbel Museum at Bad Blankenburg
Bad Blankenburg

Towns in Thuringia
Saalfeld-Rudolstadt
Schwarzburg-Rudolstadt
Spa towns in Germany